This page shows the results of the basketball tournament at the 1999 Pan American Games, held in the Winnipeg Arena in Winnipeg, Manitoba, Canada from July 31 to August 8, 1999.

Men's tournament

Preliminary round

Group A

August 1, 1999

August 2, 1999

August 4, 1999

Group B

July 31, 1999

August 1, 1999

August 4, 1999

Classification natches
August 7, 1999 – Seventh place

August 7, 1999 – Fifth place

Knockout stages

Final standings

Men's team rosters

 ARGENTINA
 Sergio Aispurua
 Gabriel Fernández
 Manu Ginóbili
 Leonardo Gutiérrez
 Wálter Herrmann
 Hernán Jasen
 Martín Leiva
 Andrés Nocioni
 Alejandro Olivares
 Leandro Palladino
 Facundo Sucatzky
 Lucas Victoriano

 BRAZIL
 Aylton Tesch
 Caio Cazziolato
 Demétrius Ferraciu
 Helio García
 André Guimarães
 Guilherme Giovannoni
 Rogério Klafke
 Marcelo Machado
 Vanderlei Mazuchini
 Michel Nascimiento
 Aristides Santos
 Sandro Varejão

 CANADA
 Richard Anderson
 Hennssy Auriantal
 Rowan Barrett
 Sherman Hamilton
 Todd MacCulloch
 Andrew Mavis
 Jordie McTavish
 Michael Meeks
 Greg Newton
 Shawn Swords
 Keith Vassell
 Jesse Young

 CUBA
 Yudit Abreu
 Roberto Amaro
 Edel Casanova
 Sergio Ferrer
 Andrés González
 Radbel Hechevarria
 Angel Nuñez
 Elieser Rojas
 Ariel Ruedas
 Ernesto Simon
 Juan Vazquez
 Amiel Vega

 DOMINICAN REPUBLIC
 Luis Flores
 Henry Lalane
 Oscaris Lenderborg
 Moises Michel
 José Utuado Molina
 Manuel Monegro
 Jaime Peterson
 Angel Romer
 Ángel Sánchez
 Joel Suarez

 PUERTO RICO
 Luis Allende
 Ricardo Dalmau
 Sharif Fajardo
 Arnaldo Febres
 Rolando Hourruitiner
 Antonio Latimer
 Fernando Ortíz
 Edgar Padilla
 Daniel Santiago
 Carmelo Travieso
 Orlando Vega

 UNITED STATES
 Damon Bailey
 James Blackwell
 Michael Hawkins
 Kermit Holmes
 Byron Houston
 Todd Lindeman
 James Martin
 Clinton "Mikki" Moore
 Doug Smith
 Matthew Steigenga
 Carl Edward Thomas
 Travis Williams

 URUGUAY
 Bruno Abratansky
 Adrián Bertolini
 Marcel Bouzout
 Jorge Cabrera
 Diego Castrillon
 Diego Losada
 Nicolás Mazzarino
 Oscar Moglia
 Pablo Morales
 Luis Silveira
 Martín Suárez
 Hugo Vázquez

Women's tournament

  Argentina
  Brazil
  Canada
  Cuba
  Dominican Republic
  United States

Round robin

July 30, 1999

July 31, 1999

August 1, 1999

August 2, 1999

August 4, 1999

Classification match
August 6, 1999 – Fifth place

Knockout stages

Final standings

Women's team rosters

 BRAZIL
 Adriana Santos
 Adriana Pinto
 Cíntia Santos
 Helen Cristina Santos Luz
 Kelly Santos
 Lilian Gonçalves
 Patrícia Silva
 Ilisaine David
 Leila de Souza
 Rosângela Pereira
 Roseli Gustavo

 UNITED STATES
 Edwina Brown
 Sylvia Crawley
 Beth Cunningham
 Katryna Gaither
 Amy Herrig
 Michelle M. Marciniak
 Danielle McCulley
 Lynn Pride
 Itoro Umoh-Coleman
 DeMya Walker
 Umeki Webb
 Dana Wynne

References
 Men's Results
 Women's Results
 LatinBasket

Basketball
1999
1999–2000 in Canadian basketball
1999–2000 in North American basketball
1999–2000 in South American basketball
International basketball competitions hosted by Canada